Carlo Michele Bonelli, Cardinal Alessandrino' (25 November 1541– 28 March 1598) was an Italian senior papal diplomat with a distinguished career that spanned two decades from 1571.

Biography
Born in Bosco Marengo, he was the son of Marco Bonelli, inscribed as a noble of Alessandria in Piedmont, 1566, and of Dominina de' Gibertis, niece of Pope Pius V. He was the great-uncle of Cardinal Carlo Bonelli (1664).

He entered the preaching Order of Dominicans, taking the name Michele, and professed at the convent of Santa Maria sopra Minerva, Rome, 1559. He studied  at the Collegio Germanico and was a professor of theology at the University of Perugia before being recalled to Rome by his great-uncle, Pius V.

He was created cardinal priest in the consistory of 6 March 1566; received the red hat and the titulus of Santa Maria sopra Minerva on 20 March and was entered with his father as a noble of Alessandria the same year; he conditioned his promotion on permission to continue wearing his Dominican habit.  He was made Grand Prior in Rome of the Sovereign Military Order of Malta, June 1568.

He was charged with the important post of Camerlengo on 3 December 1568, a post he held until 10 May 1570. In recompense he was given the sinecure of Abbot commendatario of San Michele della Chiusa.

As papal Rome was expanding, he took the initiative of developing a new quarter erected above the ancient imperial fora, laying out streets —of which via Alessandrina commemorates his title— which had come to be divided among the monasteries of S.Basilio, S.Adriano and  SS.Cosma e Damiano, and planted in orchards.

His family shared in the honours during the pontificate of Pius V: his brother Girolamo, commander of the Papal Guard, was made marchese di Cassano d’Adda (1572), and his brother Michele, having been made duca di Salci (1569), became a gentleman-in-waiting to the duke of Savoy (1573).

The "Cardinale Alessandrino", as he was styled—a title that had been borne by Pius V as a cardinal— was sent as legate to the kings of Spain and Portugal on 18 June  1571, with the honour of cardinal nipote, in the company of Francesco Borgia, and was sent as legate with the same discretionary powers a latere to the king of France on 16 November 1571.  The question of his advance notice of the imminent Saint Bartholomew's Day Massacre beginning the following 24 August has been discussed among historians and emphatically denied in the Catholic Encyclopedia .

Cardinal Alessandrino administered the last rites to his great-uncle the pope in May 1572 and participated in the ensuing conclave. Member of the Congregation of the Index Librorum Prohibitorum, 1572, of the Council, 1573.

Boinelli played a role in the transformation of the studium of the Dominican Order at Santa Maria sopra Minerva in Rome into the College of St. Thomas, the forerunner of the Pontifical University of Saint Thomas Aquinas, Angelicum.
Named by Pope Gregory XIII prefect of the Congregation of Religious. He participated in the conclave of 1585 that elected Pope Sixtus V, who named him his vicar general in Rome and the entire Papal States. He participated in the two conclaves of 1590 and in the conclaves of 1591 and of 1592. Prefect of the new Congregation for the Examination of Bishops in the pontificate of Clement VIII. He supported the reconciliation of Pope Clement VIII with Henri IV in 1594.

He was made the first count of Bosco Marengo on 29 November 1597. He died in Rome the following year after a brief illness, and was buried in his Dominican church of Santa Maria sopra Minerva, where his tomb sculpture of Prudence'' is by Stefano Maderno.

Episcopal succession

References

External links

Bonelli genealogy
Catholic Encyclopedia 1908: "St Bartholomew's Day"

16th-century Italian cardinals
Cardinal-bishops of Albano
Cardinals created by Pope Pius V
Italian Dominicans
Diplomats of the Holy See
Academic staff of the University of Perugia
1541 births
1598 deaths
People from Bosco Marengo
Cardinal-nephews
Camerlengos of the Holy Roman Church
Dominican cardinals
16th-century Italian diplomats